John Frederick Pym (born c. 1900) was a rugby union player who represented Australia.

Pym, a wing, was born in Sydney and claimed 1 international rugby cap for Australia.

References

Australian rugby union players
Australia international rugby union players
Rugby union players from Sydney
Rugby union wings